Thung Sai is a tambon (subdistrict) of Sai Thong Watthana District, in Kamphaeng Phet Province, Thailand. In 2019 it had a total population of 9,509 people.

History
The subdistrict was created effective September 15, 1972 by splitting off 7 administrative villages from Wang Yang.

Administration

Central administration
The tambon is subdivided into 17 administrative villages (muban).

Local administration
The whole area of the subdistrict is covered by the subdistrict municipality (Thesaban Tambon) Thung Sai (เทศบาลตำบลทุ่งทราย).

References

External links
Thaitambon.com on Thung Sai
Thung Sai subdistrict municipality

Tambon of Kamphaeng Phet Province
Populated places in Kamphaeng Phet province